Lucie Boissonnas (née, Bessirard de La Touche; pen name, Mme. B. Boissonnas; 20 April 1839 - 3 May 1877) was a 19th-century French writer. She was the recipient of the Montyon Prize in 1874 for Une famille pendant la guerre (1873). Boissonnas died in 1877.

Biography
Lucie Sophie Catherine Bessirard de La Touche was born in Paris, 20 April 1839. She was the daughter of Charles-Alexandre Bessirard de La Touche, director of the Société des Papeteries du Marais et de Sainte-Marie.

In 1858, she married the Parisian banker Jean-Baptiste Boissonnas (1822-1897), with whom she had four sons and two daughters. Among her children were the diplomat and businessman, Jean-Baptiste Boissonnas (1870-1953), father of Éric Boissonnas, and the pastor Georges Boissonnas (1865-1942). She is the great-grandmother of Sylvina Boissonnas. Her husband was the brother of pastor Louis-Octave Boissonnas, as well as from the same family as the photographer, Frédéric Boissonnas.

Boissonnas published two books with Hetzel editions; both used the name, "Mme. B. Boissonnas". The first, Une famille pendant la guerre (1873), was an epistolary account of her family's experience during the Franco-Prussian War of 1870. She received the Montyon Prize in 1874 for this work. The second, Un Vaincu (1875), was written when she was already suffering from tuberculosis, was a biography of General Robert E. Lee, whose daughters she knew.

She died 3 May 1877, of tuberculosis at the age of 38, in Arcachon.

Awards
 1874, Montyon Prize

Publications
 1873, Une famille pendant la guerre, Hetzel Ed.
 1875, Un Vaincu, Hetzel Ed.

References

1839 births
1877 deaths
19th-century French non-fiction writers
French biographers
19th-century French women writers
Women biographers